Miriam Villacián (born 26 May 1950) is a Cuban gymnast. She competed in six events at the 1968 Summer Olympics.

References

External links
 

1950 births
Living people
Cuban female artistic gymnasts
Olympic gymnasts of Cuba
Gymnasts at the 1968 Summer Olympics
Sportspeople from Havana
Pan American Games medalists in gymnastics
Pan American Games silver medalists for Cuba
Gymnasts at the 1971 Pan American Games
20th-century Cuban women
21st-century Cuban women